Nepal competed in the 2008 Summer Olympics which were held in Beijing, People's Republic of China from August 8 to August 24, 2008. The country was represented by eight athletes, who competed in judo, shooting, swimming and taekwondo.

This was the nation's first Olympic appearance as a new republic following the civil war which the monarchy rule was ceased to exist in 2006.

Athletics

Men

Women

Key
Note–Ranks given for track events are within the athlete's heat only
Q = Qualified for the next round
q = Qualified for the next round as a fastest loser or, in field events, by position without achieving the qualifying target
NR = National record
N/A = Round not applicable for the event
Bye = Athlete not required to compete in round

Judo

Shooting

Women

Swimming

Men

Women

Taekwondo

Weightlifting

See also
List of Olympic athletes of Nepal

References

Nations at the 2008 Summer Olympics
2008
Olympics